NHA may refer to:


Canada
 National Hockey Association
 National Housing Act, 1938

India
 National Health Authority

Philippines
 National Housing Authority (Philippines)

United Kingdom
 National Health Action Party, a political party in England

United States
 National Healthcareer Association
 National Housing Act of 1934 
 National Hydrogen Association
 National Heritage Academies

Vietnam
 NHA, the IATA code for Nha Trang Air Base

Other uses
 8895 Nha, a main-belt asteroid
 National Health Accounts, a process for monitoring the flow of money in the health sector
 National Highways Authority (disambiguation)
 Neuchâtel Hockey Academy, Swiss ice hockey club
 Nursing home administrator